Şıxmahmud (also, Şeyxmahmud, Shikhmakhmud, Shykhmakhmud and Sheik-Mahmud) is a village and municipality in the Babek District of Nakhchivan, Azerbaijan.

Geography 
It is located near the Nakhchivan-Shahbuz highway, 13 km north from the district center, on the right bank of the Nakhchivanchay River. Its economy emphasizes agriculture, growing grain, vegetables and animal husbandry.

Facilities 
The village hosts a secondary school, music school, library, culture house, kindergarten, two mosques and a medical center.

Demographics 
Şıxmahmud has a population of 2,839.

Etymology
The village was named after a nearby sacred place called Shykhmahmud. The toponym Shykhmahmud is an altered form of the name of Sheikh Mahmud.

Shikhmahmud Necropolis
Shikhmahmud Necropolis is an archaeological site near the village, dating from the 1st to 3rd centuries. It was discovered by chance on a farm in 1989. Layers of ash, fragments of clay pots, and dark blue glass beads were found in an excavated ravine. Fragments of glass jars were discovered from graves. A skeleton was found in another grave. The collected materials were given to the Nakhchivan State History Museum.

References 

Populated places in Babek District